Redbird Smith is a census-designated place (CDP) in Sequoyah County, Oklahoma, United States. It is part of the Fort Smith, Arkansas-Oklahoma Metropolitan Statistical Area. The population was 411 at the 2000 census. It was named for Redbird Smith (Cherokee), who founded the Keetoowah Nighthawk Society in Indian Territory and established a ceremonial ground here for sacred rituals.

Geography
Redbird Smith is located at  (35.560475, -95.026146).

Demographics

As of the census of 2000, there were 411 people, 153 households, and 117 families residing in the CDP. There were 170 housing units at an average density of 14.2/sq mi (5.5/km2). The racial makeup of the CDP was 75.91% White, 18.49% Native American, 0.24% Asian, and 5.35% from two or more races. Hispanic or Latino of any race were 1.22% of the population.

There were 153 households, out of which 32.0% had children under the age of 18 living with them, 63.4% were married couples living together, 7.8% had a female householder with no husband present, and 22.9% were non-families. 19.6% of all households were made up of individuals, and 6.5% had someone living alone who was 65 years of age or older. The average household size was 2.69 and the average family size was 3.13.

In the CDP, the population was spread out, with 30.2% under the age of 18, 4.1% from 18 to 24, 26.5% from 25 to 44, 27.5% from 45 to 64, and 11.7% who were 65 years of age or older. The median age was 37 years. For every 100 females, there were 116.3 males. For every 100 females age 18 and over, there were 106.5 males.

The median income for a household in the CDP was $35,563, and the median income for a family was $36,750. Males had a median income of $27,411 versus $17,500 for females. The per capita income for the CDP was $12,581. About 15.4% of families and 17.3% of the population were below the poverty line, including 24.3% of those under age 18 and 12.5% of those age 65 or over.

See also
Redbird Smith

References

Census-designated places in Sequoyah County, Oklahoma
Census-designated places in Oklahoma
Fort Smith metropolitan area